Rolf Diethelm (born May 15, 1940) is a retired Swiss professional ice hockey player who represented the Swiss national team at the 1964 Winter Olympics.

References

External links
Rolf Diethelm's stats at Sports-Reference.com

1940 births
Living people
Ice hockey players at the 1964 Winter Olympics
Olympic ice hockey players of Switzerland
Swiss ice hockey right wingers
Ice hockey people from Bern